The 12th Dáil was elected at the 1944 general election on 30 May 1944 and first met on 9 June 1944. The members of Dáil Éireann, the house of representatives of the Oireachtas (legislature), of Ireland are known as TDs. The 12th Dáil was dissolved by President Seán T. O'Kelly on 12 January 1948, at the request of the Taoiseach Éamon de Valera. The 12th Dáil lasted  days.

Composition of the 12th Dáil

Fianna Fáil, denoted with bullet, formed the 4th Government of Ireland, a minority government relying on the support of the National Labour Party and Independent TDs.

Graphical representation
This is a graphical comparison of party strengths in the 12th Dáil from June 1944. This was not the official seating plan.

Ceann Comhairle
On 9 June 1944, Frank Fahy (FF), who had served as Ceann Comhairle since 1932, was proposed by Éamon de Valera and seconded by Richard Mulcahy for the position, and was elected without a vote.

TDs by constituency
The list of the 138 TDs elected, is given in alphabetical order by Dáil constituency.

Changes

Eamonn Coogan (FG), an outgoing TD for Kilkenny, died after the dissolution of the 12th Dáil, during the 1948 general election campaign.

See also
Members of the 5th Seanad

References

External links
Houses of the Oireachtas: Debates: 12th Dáil

 
12
12th Dáil